Saint Gobain may refer to:

 Saint-Gobain SA - a French multinational corporation, founded in 1665 in Saint-Gobain, Aisne.
 Saint Gobain (Goban) (memorial on 20 June) - 7th century saint from Ireland, martyr.
 Saint-Gobain, Aisne - a commune in the Aisne department in northern France, named after Saint Gobain
 Gobban of Old Leighlin - 6th century saint from Ireland, brother of St Laserian and preceding abbey of Old Leighlin monastery. Different sources identify him with:
 St Goban (Gobhnena, memorial on 23 May) - 6th century saint from Ireland, "Gobhnena of Tascaffin". 
 St Gobban (memorial on 6 December) - 6th century saint from Ireland, "Gobban of Kill-Lamraidhe (Killamery)".
 Gobán Saor (Gobán the Builder) - legendary Irish architect from 7th century, popularly canonised as St. Gobban.